Adolf Schinnerer (15 September 1876 in Schwarzenbach an der Saale – 30 January 1949 in Ottershausen, part of Haimhausen in Oberbayern) was a German artist, active in painting, drawing and graphic design. He was also an instructor at the Academy of Fine Arts, Munich, where his students included Karl Gatermann the Younger.

1876 births
1949 deaths
German graphic designers
19th-century German painters
German male painters
20th-century German painters
20th-century German male artists
Artists from Bavaria
German art educators
19th-century German male artists
People from Hof (district)